The .45 Remington–Thompson was an experimental firearms cartridge designed by Remington Arms and Auto Ordnance for the Model 1923 Thompson submachine gun, a variant of the Model 1921 with a longer barrel, with the intent of increasing the power and range of the weapon. While some variants of the 1923 were produced, the rifle and round did not find commercial success.

References

Pistol and rifle cartridges
Military cartridges
Abandoned military projects of the United States
Remington Arms cartridges